Stausee Mapragg (Mapragg reservoir) is located at Pfäfers in the Canton of St. Gallen, Switzerland. The reservoir and Gigerwaldsee are operated by Kraftwerke Sarganserwald (NOK group) for pumped-storage hydroelectricity.

See also
List of mountain lakes of Switzerland

External links
Swissdams: Mapgragg

Kraftwerke Sarganserland  company information
Kraftwerke Sarganserland  visitor information
Kraftwerke Sarganserland scheme

Lakes of the canton of St. Gallen
Mapragg